Goats - farm animals of domestic goat (Capra hircus) species, small ruminants - are widespread throughout the world and are used in almost any natural and climatic conditions, even those where other productive animals cannot live. Different breeds of goats are adapted to different livestock systems - from small herds of 3-5 heads on meager grazing to large intensive livestock farms, from year-round grazing to fully stable housing, with many intermediate variations between them. Goats are a source of several types of products, of which the main ones are milk, meat and wool. Among the goat breeds there are highly productive specialized, dual-triple-use and universal breeds. External differences between breeds are represented by many major and minor traits that vary in a very wide range. Goat breeds (especially dairy goats) are some of the oldest defined animal breeds for which breed standards and production records have been kept. Selective breeding of goats generally focuses on improving production of fiber, meat, dairy products or goatskin. Breeds are generally classified based on their primary use, though there are several breeds which are considered dual- or multi-purpose.

List

References

Bibliography
 
 
 Introduction to Common Goat Breeds Mother Earth News
 Raising Goats for Dummies (Wiley, 2010)

Goat
 Goat breeds